Utgard is the fifteenth studio album by Norwegian extreme metal band Enslaved, released 2 October 2020 by Nuclear Blast.

Background 
Utgard is the first Enslaved album with new drummer Iver Sandøy, who had previously co-produced several of the band's albums and joined full-time following the departure of longtime drummer Cato Bekkevold in 2018. The album was originally scheduled for release in early 2020, but was delayed until October of that year due to the COVID-19 pandemic.

The album is titled after a location in Norse mythology and includes some Norse lyrics and song titles. A video, filmed in Iceland, was released for the song "Jettegryta". Utgard continues to display some of the band's early black metal roots while continuing their experimentation with 1970s progressive rock.

Critical reception
The album received mostly positive reviews upon its release. Kerrang! noted that "Enslaved take the listener through a frightening landscape in Norse mythology where the gods have no control and chaos reigns" and called the band "masters" and "elder statesmen" of progressive black metal. Blabbermouth noted that the album "feels like the true culmination of Enslaved's ascendancy to the throne of modern prog-metal wizardry." The Prog division of Loudersound concluded that Utgard is the ultimate result of musical experiments that the band had been conducting over their past several albums. In the words of Antihero, "Enslaved deliver their elite brand of Prog/Extreme Metal that they have so meticulously hammered out over the past three decades." Metal Hammer named it as the 9th best metal album of 2020.

Track listing

Personnel
Ivar Bjørnson – electric guitars, acoustic guitars, synthesizers, keyboards, sequencer, FX, backing vocals (track 1)
Grutle Kjellson – vocals, bass, synthesizer
Iver Sandøy – vocals, drums, percussion, keyboards, FX
Håkon Vinje  – keyboards, piano, vocals
Arve Isdal – electric guitars, acoustic guitars, backing vocals (track 1)
Additional personnel:
 Martin "Bellhammer" Horntveth – percussion, synthesizers, glockenspiel, tubular bells, rototoms, programming (track 3)
 Inger Sunneva Peersen, Sonja Elisabeth Peersen – backing vocals (track 9)

Charts

References

2020 albums
Enslaved (band) albums
Nuclear Blast albums
Albums postponed due to the COVID-19 pandemic